Atella is a town and comune in the province of Potenza, in the Southern Italian region of Basilicata.

It is bounded by the comuni of Avigliano, Bella, Calitri, Filiano, Rionero in Vulture, Ripacandida, Ruvo del Monte and San Fele.

See also
 Santa Maria da Nives, Atella
Monticchio
Vulture (region)

References

External links

Official website  
AltrAtella website 

Cities and towns in Basilicata